Operation Backfire may refer to:

Operation Backfire (WWII)
Operation Backfire (FBI), an FBI operation against certain actions by the radical environmental movement.